Hyphantidium albicostale is a moth of the family Pyralidae first described by Francis Walker in 1863. It is sometimes placed in the genus Ephestia, by considering Hyphantidium as a synonym. It is found in Fiji and probably in Sri Lanka.

References

Moths of Asia
Moths described in 1863
Phycitini